Grabno  (German Weitzdorf) is a village in the administrative district of Gmina Kętrzyn, within Kętrzyn County, Warmian-Masurian Voivodeship, in northern Poland.

References

Castles of the Teutonic Knights
Grabno